Ilumatobacter nonamiensis is a Gram-positive, aerobic, and non-motile bacterium from the genus Ilumatobacter.

References

External links
Type strain of Ilumatobacter nonamiensis at BacDive -  the Bacterial Diversity Metadatabase

Actinomycetota
Bacteria described in 2013